Obelura is a genus of earwigs belonging to the family Forficulidae.

Species:

Obelura asiatica 
Obelura tamul

References

Forficulidae